William Wade Zedler, known as Bill Zedler (born August 19, 1943), is a retired medical consultant from Arlington, Texas who is a Republican member of the Texas House of Representatives for District 96. He has served since 2003 except for the term from 2009 to 2011, when he was temporarily unseated by Democrat Chris Turner.

A board member of the bipartisan Texas Conservative Coalition, Zedler is considered one of the most conservative of current Texas legislators.

Zedler won his seventh nonconsecutive term in the state House in the general election held on November 6, 2018. With 32,656 votes (50.9 percent), he defeated Democrat Ryan E. Ray, who polled 30,295 (47.2 percent). The Libertarian Stephen Parmer held another 746 votes (1.9 percent).

In February 2019, Zedler, whom The Texas Observer labeled an "outspoken anti-vaxxer", drew national attention when he introduced a Texas bill that would allow parents to opt-out of school vaccination requirements. The move was criticized as support for the anti-vax movement, so he later tried to set the record straight by explaining he wasn't "completely against vaccines". He was also criticized for his false claim that measles, which is caused by a virus, could be treated with antibiotics. He was quoted as saying "They want to say people are dying of measles. Yeah, in third-world countries they're dying of measles. Today, with antibiotics and that kind of stuff, they’re not dying in America." In the U.S. 1-2 people die for every 1000 people infected with measles.

References

 

1943 births
Living people
Republican Party members of the Texas House of Representatives
People from Arlington, Texas
Businesspeople from Texas
United States Army officers
Sam Houston State University alumni
Place of birth missing (living people)
21st-century American politicians
Military personnel from Texas